Peter Ferdinando is a British character actor, known for his varied performances.

He has collaborated extensively with director and cousin Gerard Johnson, playing the title role in the critically acclaimed Tony and the lead role in their more recent film together, the award-winning Hyena.

He played the King Pin Spencer in David Mackenzie's prison drama Starred Up.

He also regularly collaborates with British filmmaker Ben Wheatley, having played Jacob in A Field in England, The Half-Face Man in "Deep Breath", the first episode of series 8 of Doctor Who, and Paul in Wheatley's High-Rise.

More recent work includes Tommy's Honour with Peter Mullan, directed by Jason Connery, Ghost in the Shell, with Scarlett Johansson and Juliet Binoche, directed by Rupert Sanders, and Guy Ritchie's King Arthur: Legend of the Sword, with Jude Law. In 2017, he starred in Woody Harrelson's experimental, live film directorial debut Lost In London alongside Owen Wilson, Willie Nelson and Woody Harrelson.

Peter lives in London. He is also cousin of Matt Johnson, an English singer-songwriter best known as the vocalist and only constant member of his band, The The.

Filmography

Film

Television

References

External links
 

21st-century British male actors
British male film actors
British male television actors
Place of birth missing (living people)
Year of birth missing (living people)
20th-century births
Living people